Ivars Zariņš  (born 1969) is a Latvian politician. He is a member of Harmony and a deputy of the 12th Saeima.

References

Saeima website

1969 births
Living people
People from Jēkabpils
Social Democratic Party "Harmony" politicians
Deputies of the 11th Saeima
Deputies of the 12th Saeima
Deputies of the 13th Saeima